Tomás Coelho is a neighborhood in the North Zone of Rio de Janeiro, Brazil.

The neighbourhood is home to the Thomaz Coelho Station on the Rio de Janeiro Metro and Thomaz Coelho Station on the SuperVia rail network.

References

Neighbourhoods in Rio de Janeiro (city)